Aylostera, is a genus of cactus, native to central Bolivia and north western Argentina.

It was published in Anales Soc. Ci. Argent. vol.96 on page 75 in 1923.

It was once thought to be a synonym of Rebutia.
The phylogenetic relationships in Aylostera was studied in detail by Ritz et al. (2016) based on the plastid DNA regions atpB-rbcL and trnS-trnG as well as AFLPs and morphological characters. Aylostera was confirmed as monophyletic and as distantly related to the clade that contains the type species of Rebutia , thus justifying recognizing Aylostera as a separate genus.

Species
There are 9 accepted species;

References

Cactoideae
Endemic flora of Bolivia
Flora of Northwest Argentina
Taxa described in 1923
Cactaceae genera